The Queens Jewish Center, also known as Queens Jewish Center and Talmud Torah or QJC, is an Orthodox synagogue in Forest Hills, Queens, New York known for its significant contributions to the Jewish community.  The synagogue was established by a dozen families in 1943 to serve the growing central Queens Jewish community. The current spiritual leader is Rabbi Judah Kerbel.

Organization Affiliations
The Queens Jewish Center is a member of the following Jewish organizations:
Orthodox Union (OU)
Queens Jewish Community Council (QJCC)
Vaad Harabonim of Queens (VHQ)

Services
Queens Jewish Center has services every day of the week, including holidays.

Architecture
The Queens Jewish Center building won honorable mention in the 1955 Queens Chamber of Commerce, Annual Building Awards. The architect was David Moed of Manhattan and the Builder was the LeFrak Organization.

The structure actually consists of two separate buildings. On October 3, 1946 an option was taken on the vacant plot where both Synagogue buildings now stand. Ground was first broken for the first building (also referred to as the Talmud Torah building or Bais Hamedrash building) during an elaborate ceremony on June 5, 1949, by Judge Paul Balsam and Center President Herman A. Levine. The ground-breaking for the Main Synagogue building took place on June 21, 1953 and was made possible by generous benefactor, Mr. Harry LeFrak.

Rabbi Tenure
Rabbi Eliezer Harbater (1943–1946)
Rabbi Aryeh Gotlieb (1946–1949)
Rabbi Morris Max (1949–1966)
Rabbi Joseph Grunblatt (1967–2006)
Rabbi Benjamin Geiger (2007–2013)
Rabbi Simcha Hopkovitz (2013–2018)
Rabbi Judah Kerbel (2019–Present)

Notable Members
Harry LeFrak
Rabbi Dr. Bernard Lander
Judge Paul Balsam

References

External links
 

Synagogues in Queens, New York
Orthodox synagogues in New York City
Forest Hills, Queens
Synagogues completed in 1955
1955 establishments in New York City
Moderne architecture in New York City